Pentila rogersi, or Rogers' pentila, is a butterfly in the family Lycaenidae. The species was first described by Hamilton Herbert Druce in 1907. It is found in Kenya and Tanzania. The habitat consists of coastal forests and lowland forests at altitudes ranging from sea level to 900 metres.

Subspecies
Pentila rogersi rogersi (coast of Kenya, coast of Tanzania)
Pentila rogersi parapetreia Rebel, 1908 (Tanzania: north-east to the Uluguru and Usambara mountains)

References

Butterflies described in 1907
Poritiinae
Taxa named by Hamilton Herbert Druce